Harpalus simplicidens is a species of ground beetle in the subfamily Harpalinae. It was described by Schauberger in 1929.

References

simplicidens
Beetles described in 1929